Abdullah Said may refer to:
 Abdallah El Said (born 1985), Egyptian footballer
 Abdullah Said al Libi (died 2009), alleged al Qaeda leader, killed in a missile strike from an unmanned drone
 Ben Saïd Abdallah (born 1924), French Olympic athlete

See also